is a district of Higashiyama-ku, Kyoto, Japan, originating as an entertainment district in the Sengoku period, in front of Yasaka Shrine (Gion Shrine). The district was built to accommodate the needs of travellers and visitors to the shrine. It eventually evolved to become one of the most exclusive and well-known geisha districts in all of Japan. Gion is the Japanese translation (via Chinese Qiyuan) of the Buddhist term Jetavana.

The geisha in Kyoto do not refer to themselves as geisha, instead using the local term . While the term geisha means "artist" or "person of the arts", the more direct term  means essentially "a woman of art".

Divisions
The two were originally the same district, but split many years ago. Gion Kobu is larger, occupying most of the district including the famous street Hanamikoji, while Gion Higashi is smaller and occupies the northeast corner, centered on its rehearsal hall. Despite the considerable decline in the number of geisha in Gion in the last century, the area is still famous for the preservation of forms of traditional architecture and entertainment.

Part of this district has been declared a national historical preservation district. The City of Kyoto has undertaken a number of restorative projects to enhance the beauty and historical authenticity of Kyoto's , such as relocating overhead utilities underground. Since 1986, the city has removed electric poles from a number of popular tourist destinations such as Nene no Michi (ねねの道), Hanamikoji (花見小路), and Pontocho (先斗町).

Entertainment

Geisha

Both geisha and  can be seen travelling throughout the district to attend parties, lessons and various other engagements.

Geisha and  both perform in public dance events staged yearly, such as the Miyako Odori; some also perform dances for tourists at Gion Corner.

Other 
There are also many modern entertainment establishments in Gion – restaurants, bars, clubs, pachinko, off-track betting, and a very large number of tourist-oriented establishments, particularly along Shijō Street; the region is both a major tourist hub, and a popular nightlife spot for locals.

The stretch of the Shirakawa River before it enters the Kamo river is also a popular preserved area. It is lined on the south side with traditional establishments which directly face the river, and some are accessed by crossing bridges from the north side. The north side was previously also lined with buildings, but these were torn down in World War II as a fire-prevention measure, and the section is now primarily a pedestrian street, lined with cherry blossoms. These are lit up in the evening in the spring, and the area is active year-round.

Annual events

The oldest of these date to the Kyoto exhibition of 1872. The more popular of these is the Miyako Odori, literally "Dances of the Old Capital" (sometimes instead referred to as the "Cherry Blossom Dances"), staged by the geisha of Gion Kobu, which dates to 1872. The dances run from April 1 through April 30 each year during the height of the cherry blossom season. Spectators from Japan and worldwide attend the events, which range from "cheap" seats on tatami mats on the floor, to reserved seats with a small tea ceremony beforehand. Gion Higashi holds a similar dance in early November, around autumn leaves, known as Gion Odori; this is more recent and has fewer performances.

Education
The Kyoto Municipal Board of Education operates public elementary and junior high schools. Gionmachi Kitagawa and Gionmachi Minamigawa are zoned to Kaisei Elementary and Junior High School (開睛小中学校).

In popular culture
 Gion is the setting of much of Arthur Golden's novel Memoirs of a Geisha.
 Gion Kobu was also where Mineko Iwasaki lived and conducted business as a geisha, as mentioned in her autobiography Geisha of Gion.
 Gion is the setting of several films by Kenji Mizoguchi, including:
 1936 
 1953 
 Part of the Gion area is featured as a photo travel landscape in the 2010 racing video game Gran Turismo 5.

See also
 Kyoto hanamachi
 Miyagawachō, another district located just south of Gion
 Pontochō, another district on west side of Kamo river
 Kamishichiken, the oldest district in Kyoto

Notes

References

External links

Miyako Odori 

Geography of Kyoto
Gion faith